Klasea is a genus of Eurasian and North African plants in the tribe Cardueae within the family Asteraceae.

 Species

 formerly included
 Klasea chinensis - Rhaponticum chinense
 Klasea insularis - Serratula coronata var. insularis

References

Cynareae
Asteraceae genera